is a classical, non-resonant trans-Neptunian object from the Kuiper belt in the outermost region of the Solar System, also known as a cubewano. It was discovered at Palomar Observatory in 2002.

Its rotation period is 8.8 hours and it is a moderately red color. Tancredi notes that photometric observations suggest that it is a spheroid with a high albedo and small albedo spots. However, its low albedo suggests it does not have planetary geology, as it should if it were a dwarf planet.

Description

Discovery 

 was discovered on 10 January 2002, by astronomers at the Palomar Observatory in California. Astronomers involved in the discovery were Michael Brown, Chad Trujillo, Eleanor Helin, Michael Hicks, Kenneth Lawrence and Steven H. Pravdo. It is located near the Kuiper cliff.

Orbit and classification 

 orbits the Sun at a distance of 40.9–53.2 AU once every 322.6 years (over 117,800 days; semi-major axis of 47 AU). Its orbit has an eccentricity of 0.13 and an inclination of 24° with respect to the ecliptic. The body's observation arc begins with a precovery taken at Haleakala-NEAT/GEODSS  in December 1997, more than 4 years prior to its official discovery observation at Palomar. At 45.4 AU from the Sun, it continues to slowly approach the Sun until its perihelion passage at 41.1 AU in May 2078.

Physical characteristics 

Surface 

ESO analysis of spectra reveals a strong red slope and no presence of water ice (in contrast to Quaoar, also red) suggesting organic material (see comparison of colours and typical composition inferred from spectra of the TNOs).

See also
 174567 Varda – a similar TNO by orbit, size and color
List of Solar System objects by size

References

External links 

 Cruikshank, D., et al. High Albedo KBO (55565)2002 AW197, The Astronomical Journal Letters, 624,53 (May 2004). Abstract
 Physical and dynamical characteristics of icy "dwarf planets" (plutoids),  G. Tancredi, IAU Symposium No. 263  (2009)
 Kuiper Belt Object Magnitudes and Surface Colors, Stephen C. Tegler, June 2018
 
 
 

Classical Kuiper belt objects
Discoveries by the Palomar Observatory
Possible dwarf planets
20020110